Malema is a town in the district of Malema. It is situated within the province of Nampula in Mozambique. The district borders the districts of: Ribaue, Lalaua, Alto Molocue, Gurue, Cuamba, and others. The district is dependent on agricultural production and the main sources are sourgum, corn, peanuts, and onions.

Transport 

It is served by a way-station of the southern network of Mozambique Railways as well as the EN 13.

See also 

 Transport in Mozambique
 Railway stations in Mozambique

References 

Populated places in Nampula Province